Larkana is a city in Sindh, Pakistan.

Larkana may also refer to:
Larkana District, a district of Sindh, Pakistan
Larkana Taluka, a tehsil of Larkana District
Larkana Division, an administrative unit of Sindh, Pakistan

See also
Larkana Junction railway station, a railway station in Pakistan
Larkana Bulls, a local cricket team